The Bayer designation ι Muscae (Iota Muscae) is shared by two stars in the constellation Musca:
ι1 Muscae
ι2 Muscae

Muscae, Iota
Musca (constellation)